Rajdhov or Rajdhob is one of the least counted indigenous group of people mainly in terai of Nepal.There is always a confusion in between the varna whether they are Kshatriya or Vaishya. In general, they are categorized as Madhesi.

History

The sixth incarnation of Lord Vishnu, Parashurama was described in some versions of the Mahabharata as the angry Brahmin who killed a huge number of Kshatriya warriors with his axe because they were abusing his power. As a result, Kshatriyas hides in Dhobi family to save their life. They forgot their main practice while staying in Dhobi community but they could not become Dhobi as per their inner culture and feelings. They started involving themselves in agriculture/farming cultural values in society. There are so many clans (Thar/ Titles) of this caste. The proof of being warrior is still alive. There is a tradition of putting bow and arrow in a ceremony called CHHATHIHAR ( celebration of childbirth after on sixth day ). So, in conclusion this caste has been transformed from Chhetris. There are so many brave figures of the community. Out of them Lakhay Madar is most popular. He was born in 17th century.

Demography

Surnames
 Mandal/Madar()
 Khadga()
 Raut()
 Majhi()
 Singh()
 Adhikari()
 Das()
 Laugi()
 Sant()
 Ishar()
 Kapair()
 Bishwas()
 Pramani()
 Paik()
 Parihast()
 Padey()
 Paikra()
 Gami()

Inclusiveness
As of 18 December 2019, only three of total Rajdhoves are in Nepal Army.

Language
Mainly they speak Maithili and Angika. Nepali, Bhojpuri, Hindi and English are the preferable secondary language.

Events
1. Honour programme of Satya Narayan Mandal in DDC, Saptari meeting hall, Rajbiraj was organized by the Rajdhob Federation India/Nepal on 16 December 2017. This is the honorific moment after his win in the election of Provincial Assembly of Province No. 2.

2. Rajdhov Diwas: Rajdhov people organize a meeting day every year on the day of Saraswati Puja. They spend some time together and discuss the issues for the upliftment of Rajdhoves.

Poem

             -Yugal Kishor Rajdhov

Notable persons
 Birendra Majhi - Mayor of Hanumannagar Kankalini Municipality, Saptari district 
 Satya Narayan Mandal – CPNUML leader, former youth and sports minister of Nepal and first minister from Rajdhoves.
 CK Raut - President of Janamat Party Nepal
 Prakash Mani Raut - National President of Backward Castes Association, Nepal

Notes

References

Caste system in Nepal
Ethnic groups in India
Ethnic groups in Nepal